Sulaimania may refer to:
Sulaimania (plant), a plant genus in the mint family (Lamiaceae)
Sulaimania (spider), a spider genus in the family Tetrablemmidae
 Sulaimania governorate, a governorate in Iraqi Kurdistan
Sulaymaniyah, a town in Iraq, capital of the Sulaimania governorate
 Sulaimania University, a public university located in the city of Sulaymaniyah